The Entrance Band is the first album by the full-band version of Entrance, and that act's fourth album overall.

Track listing 

 All songs were written by Guy Blakeslee

"Lookout! - 3:31
"M.L.K." - 5:09
"Still Be There" - 4:37
"Sing For the One" - 4:09
"You're So Fine" - 6:11
"Grim Reaper Blues (Pt. 2)" - 6:45
"That is Why" - 3:42
"Lives" - 4:55
"You Must Turn" - 7:21
"Hourglass" - 6:18

Personnel 

Guy Blakeslee - Vocals, guitar
Paz Lenchantin - Violin, bass guitar, vocals
Derek James - Drums, percussion

References 

Album info link

2009 albums